The Meliá Barcelona Sarrià Hotel is a skyscraper hotel in Barcelona, Catalonia, Spain. Completed in 1972, has 23 floors and rises 83 metres. It is part of Meliá Hotels International. The hotel has 333 rooms.

See also 
 List of tallest buildings and structures in Barcelona

External links 
 Official page of Meliá Barcelona Sarrià Hotel

References 

Skyscraper hotels in Barcelona
Hotel buildings completed in 1972
Hotels established in 1972